Shane Patrick Kluivert (born 24 September 2007) is a Dutch professional footballer currently playing as a forward for Barcelona.

Club career
Born in Zaandam to Patrick Kluivert and Rossana Lima, Kluivert started his career with Amsterdam-based side Buitenveldert, before a move to French side Paris Saint-Germain, where his father was serving as technical director.

In August 2017, he followed in the footsteps of his father by signing for Spanish side Barcelona.

International career
Kluivert has represented the Netherlands at under-16 level, receiving his first call-up in September 2022. He remains eligible to represent Suriname.

Personal life

Family
Kluivert hails from a footballing family, with his father, Patrick Kluivert, having notably played for numerous top clubs across Europe, as well as the Netherlands national football team. In addition to this, his grandfather is former Surinamese international Kenneth Kluivert, and his half-brothers, Justin, Quincy and Ruben, have all pursued careers in professional football, with Justin also representing the Netherlands at international level.

Cooking
As well as football, Kluivert also has an interest in cooking, running Instagram and YouTube accounts dedicated to this passion. He has had two cooking books published; the first in 2018, called Koken met Shane (Cooking with Shane), and the second in 2020, called Vega met Shane (Vegan with Shane).

Sponsorship
In July 2017, he signed a contract with American sportswear manufacturer Nike. At the age of nine, he was the youngest European athlete with a clothing contract at the time. He extended this contract in 2022.

Books
 Koken met Shane. 40 recepten stap-voor-stap. Voor kinderen en ouders (Kosmos Uitgevers, 2018) 
 Vega met Shane. 40 stap-voor-staprecepten voor het hele gezin (Kosmos Uitgevers, 2020)

References

2007 births
Living people
Kluivert family
People from Zaanstad
Dutch sportspeople of Surinamese descent
Dutch chefs
Dutch footballers
Association football forwards
SC Buitenveldert players
Paris Saint-Germain F.C. players
FC Barcelona players
Dutch expatriate footballers
Dutch expatriate sportspeople in France
Expatriate footballers in France
Dutch expatriate sportspeople in Spain
Expatriate footballers in Spain